Football has been a sport at the South Asian Games since it commenced in 1984. Since the 2004 South Asian Games, the age limit for men's teams is under 23, plus up to three overaged players for each squad, which is the same as the age limit in football competitions at the Summer Olympics and Asian Games. Nepal and Pakistan are currently the most successful countries in the Men's event with 4 Gold Medals each while India is the most successful in Women's event with 3 Gold Medals.

Women's football tournaments were introduced in 2010.

Results

Men's tournament
Accurate as of 10 December 2019.

Since 2004 the tournament is for Under-23 teams.

Women's tournament
Accurate as of 9 December 2019.

Medal table

Men's medal table

Women's medal table

See also
 SAFF Championship

References

 
Sports at the South Asian Games
South Asian Games
South Asian Games